Mehran Modiri (born 7 April 1967) is an Iranian director, producer, actor, and singer. He is considered to be the leading artist in social satire in Iran.
His various series, which have been broadcast through IRIB have set records in terms of viewership (an estimated 95% viewership when he is on-air), as well as make him a popular personality among the masses. His artistic career began in his teenage years acting in local plays. He then entered the world of radio and television in the early 1990s, actively writing scripts for and participating in various comedy skits during the annual Norooz comedy television shows broadcast by the IRIB.

He achieved real stardom with his creation of Pavarchin (Tiptoeing), in which he won numerous awards for directing and starring in the picture. He tasted success again when he directed and starred in Noghtechin (Ellipsis), and Jayezeye Bozorg (The Grand Prize), which became major hits on television in Iran. Later, he followed Pavarchins storyline with the making of Shabhaye Barareh which became his most popular television program yet; the show remained incomplete after it was criticized for offending rural people. This resulted in an abrupt end to the show after 92 episodes without completely explaining the Barareh history. He starred in two full-length films and had planned on entering the film industry once again after Shabhaye Barareh was completed. However, he instead produced and released his next project, the television series Baghe Mozaffar.

One of his most popular tv series was The man with a thousand faces, broadcast in 2008.

Also, his shows have been popular among the Iranians because of expressing the problems of the society in the form of comedy, as he believes this genre has the most effectiveness on people.

Modiri has also released a music album and performed in a number of concerts. He is also a veteran of the Iran–Iraq War.

In 2009 Modiri was named by Newsweek as one of the 20 people who dominate power and public discourse in Iran. Between 2015–2018 Modiri was mostly seen on Nasim TV with his program Dorehami.

In order to support the death of Mehsa Amini and the nationwide protests, Mehran Modiri announced by publishing a video on his Instagram that none of the Iranian television channels have the right to publish his image in television advertisements and periodicals. A few days after these events, the Iranian government  announced that Mehran Modiri has been banned from leaving the country, however, Iranian news agencies have announced that Mehran has left Iran.  An Iranian Twitter user announced that Mehran had left Tehran for the UAE, but his final destination was not Dubai.

Personal life 
Mehran Modiri is the last child of a family originally from the city of Arak. He has three elder brothers. 

Modiri was born and raised in a low-income family in the south of Tehran, Iran. He worked in many physical and low-paying jobs as a child and teenager, including carpenter, porter, welder, mechanic, and baker.

Filmography 
Mehran Modiri has acted in various TV series. Most of the popularity and fame he has garnered among the people of Iran emanates from his participation in these programs.

TV series

Home Video

Film

Theater

Discography 

Albums
 1999: Deltangi-ha – Declamation of Hatef Alimardani 's Poems.
 2000: Az Roo-ye Sadegi – composed by: Babak Bayat and Fardin Khalatbari
Singles
 2003: Ahang-e Film-e Hamnafas – composed by: Fardin Khalatbari
 2004: Ahang-e film-e Shabhaye barareh
 2005: Ahang-e film-e Baghe mozaffar
 2010: Ahang-e serial-e Ghahveye Talkh – two tracks, produced by Bahram Dehghanyar
 2010: Bia Berim Kooh – produced by Darkoob Band in Darkoob Album
 2010: Heyran – produced by Darkoob Band in Darkoob Album
 2016: Ahang-e Titraje Dorehami – composed by Mahyar Alizadeh
 2016: Ahang-e serial-e Zaaferani – Two tracks, composed by Mahyar Alizadeh
 2017: Ahang-e Yar Toei – composed by Mahyar Alizadeh

Awards and nominations 
Mehran Modiri with 7 awards holds the record for most Hafez Awards won by an individual until 2018

References

External links

 
 

1967 births
Living people
Iranian comedians
People from Tehran
Iranian male singers
Musicians from Tehran
Iranian film directors
Iranian male film actors
Iranian male stage actors
Iranian stand-up comedians
Iranian television directors
Iranian male television actors
Iranian television talk show hosts
Iranian radio and television presenters
Islamic Republic of Iran Army soldiers of the Iran–Iraq War